Krzysztof Krauze  (2 April 1953 – 24 December 2014) was a Polish film director, cinematographer and actor, best known for his thriller The Debt (1999).

Life and career
Krauze was born in Warsaw and completed his cinematography studies at the National Film School in Łódź in the 1970s. He left Poland in 1980, but returned in 1983. In the 1980s and early 1990s he worked for various production studios in Poland. In 1997 he was named "Man of the Year" by the Polish magazine Życie. He also acted in several films by other Polish directors.

Death
Krauze was diagnosed with prostate cancer in 2006, and died on 24 December 2014, aged 61.

Filmography
 1976: Pierwsze kroki
 1977: Symetrie
 1978: Elementarz
 1979: Dwa listy
 1979: Deklinacja
 1981: Praktyczne wskazówki dla zbieraczy motyli
 1981: Dzień kobiet
 1984: Jest
 1984: Robactwo
 1988: Nowy Jork, czwarta rano
 1993: Nauka na całe życie
 1994: Kontrwywiad
 1994: Nauka trzech narodów
 1994: Spadł, umarł, utonął
 1994: Ogrody Tadeusza Reichsteina
 1996: Departament IV
 1996: Gry uliczne
 1997: Fotoamator
 1997: Stan zapalny
 1999: Dług
 2000: Wielkie rzeczy
 2004: Mój Nikifor
 2006: Plac Zbawiciela
 2013: Papusza

References

External links

Polish news

1953 births
2014 deaths
Polish film directors
Polish male actors
Polish cinematographers
Film people from Warsaw
Deaths from prostate cancer
Deaths from cancer in Poland